Calpodes ethlius, the Brazilian skipper, larger canna leafroller or canna skipper, is a butterfly of the family Hesperiidae. It is found in the United States from southern Florida and southern Texas, south through the West Indies, Mexico, and Central America to Argentina. Strays and temporary colonies can be found north to southern Nevada, northern Texas, Illinois and Massachusetts.

The wingspan is 45–61 mm. Adults are on wing in late summer in the north. There are several generations from April to December in southern Texas, two generations from July to November in Arizona. Adults are on wing throughout the year in Florida and the tropics.

The larvae feed on various Cannaceae species, including Canna flaccida, Canna indica, Canna edulis and Canna lutea. The larvae roll the leaves of their host, reducing the aesthetic appeal of ornamental canna. Leaf feeding by later instar larvae may be so severe that plants do not flower. In food crops such as arrowroot, severely defoliated plants may produce little of the harvestable rhizome.

Adults feed on Lantana in Arizona. In Costa Rica, adults have been recorded feeding on the nectar from large white or pale yellow flowers of woody lianas, trees and shrubs.

References

External links
Species info
Butterflies and Moths of North America

Hesperiinae
Butterflies of Central America
Butterflies of the Caribbean
Butterflies of North America
Hesperiidae of South America